Qaid ibn Hammad ibn Buluggin, (Qayid bin Hammad bin bolowjin) was the second Hammadid ruler in what is now Algeria.

Life 
He succeeded his father  Hammad ibn Buluggin in 1028. He named his brother Yusuf as governor of North Africa, and another brother, Ouighlan, governor of Hamza. In 1038 he was attacked by Hammama, lord of Fes but pushed him back after which Hammama requested peace and declared his submission to the Hammadids. Four years later, he signed a treaty of peace with the Zirid  Al-Mu'izz ibn Badis, who had moved against him from Kairouan.

In 1048, when al-Muizz declared himself subject of the Abbasid caliph of Baghdad, Qaid confirmed his allegiance to the Fatimid caliphs of Egypt, obtaining by caliph Ma'ad al-Mustansir Billah the title of Sharaf al-Dawla.

He died in 1054, and was succeeded  by his son Muhsin ibn Qaid.

References

1054 deaths
Hammadids
Year of birth unknown
11th-century rulers in Africa
11th-century Berber people

Berber rulers